Sweden competed at the 2022 World Games held in Birmingham, United States from 7 to 17 July 2022. Athletes representing Sweden won three gold medals, six silver medals and five bronze medals. The country finished in 19th place in the medal table.

Medalists

Competitors
The following is the list of number of competitors in the Games.

Air sports

Sweden competed in air sports and drone racing.

Archery

Sweden won three medals in archery.

Bowling

Sweden won one bronze medal in bowling.

Canoe marathon

Sweden competed in canoe marathon.

Cue sports

Sweden competed in cue sports.

Floorball

Sweden won the floorball tournament.

Summary

Group play

Semifinal

Gold medal game

Ju-jitsu

Sweden competed in ju-jitsu.

Karate

One competitor represented Sweden in karate.

Muaythai

Sweden won one bronze medal in muaythai.

Orienteering

Sweden won three medals in orienteering.

Parkour

Sweden won three medals in parkour.

Powerlifting

Sweden competed in powerlifting.

Trampoline gymnastics

Sweden won one bronze medal in trampoline gymnastics.

Tug of war

Sweden won one silver medal in tug of war.

Water skiing

Sweden competed in water skiing.

References

Nations at the 2022 World Games
2022
World Games